The Super League Test series was a rugby three-test match series between the Great Britain Lions and Super League's Australian national team held during November 1997 in England. Named the British Gas Test series due to sponsorship from Centrica's British Gas brand, it went to a decider in the third test that was won by Australia.

Background
The Australian side consisted only of players from the 1997 Telstra Cup season (which was run by the Super League (SL)), with none from the 1997 Optus Cup season (which was run by the Australian Rugby League (ARL), who continue to disregard the series and do not count its matches in their records). England's Rugby Football League on the other hand, who had been aligned with the Super League since 1995, does count the series' games as genuine test matches in their player records.

Coming off the disaster of the Lions 1996 Oceania tour (which did not include Australia) where the team won its tests against Papua New Guinea and Fiji, but lost all 3 tests against New Zealand and indeed did not even win a game on the New Zealand leg of the tour, The Lions were looking for redemption. The British team were also attempting to win their first series against Australia since 1970 and their first home series win against Australia since 1959. Lions fullback/winger Jason Robinson was the only player from both teams who was not actually a Super League aligned player having signed an ARL contract in 1995 at the height of the Super League war. Robinson had in fact played for a Rest of the World team in a test against the Australian Kangaroos (ARL) earlier in 1997. Although contracted to them, the ARL did not object to Robinson's selection for Great Britain. Robinson had been controversially left off Great Britain's 1996 Oceania tour by the RFL due to his ARL contract.

Test Venues
The three tests took place at the following venues:

First Test

This was Australia's first visit to Wembley Stadium since the ARL-only Kangaroos' 16–8 win over England in the 1995 Rugby League World Cup Final. It was also the 6th and final time the Australians would play at the famous venue until the 2011 Rugby League Four Nations when they played England at the new Wembley Stadium. Great Britain on the other hand, were hoping for a repeat of their Wembley victories over Australia to begin both the 1990 (19–12) and 1994 (8–4) Ashes Series. An Australian team drawn from the rebel Super League competition was much too good for a Britain team coached by former Great Britain international Andy Goodway and captained by giant Wigan lock forward Andy Farrell.

Former Aussie international John Lang was coach of the Australians with the team captained by Laurie Daley, a veteran of the successful 1990 and 1994 Kangaroo tours, and one of only five players in the team who had played a test at Wembley (Daley, Brett Mullins, Wendell Sailor and Steve Walters had played in 1994, while Andrew Ettinghausen had played in both 1990 and 1994. Walters had also played in the 1992 Rugby League World Cup Final at Wembley when Australia defeated Great Britain 10–6 in front of a then world record international attendance of 73,631). Future great of the game Darren Lockyer made his international debut for Australia at fullback.

This would be the last rugby league Test match played at the old Wembley Stadium which was demolished in 2003. The victory giving Australia a 6–4 record at the famous old stadium dating back to the last game of the 1929–30 Kangaroo Tour when Australia defeated Wales 26–10 in what was the first ever rugby league international played at Wembley. The Kangaroos would next get to play Wembley in October 2011, that time at the new Wembley Stadium when they defeated England 36–20 in the 2011 Four Nations.

Second Test
This game remains the only time that an Australian team has lost at Old Trafford since first playing at the "Theatre of Dreams" in 1986.

Great Britain dropped three players following their first test defeat; Mick Cassidy, Anthony Sullivan and Dean Sampson. Martin Crompton was also sacked from the squad after failing to report to training.

Gordon Tallis was sin-binned for dissent in the second half. Andy Farrell was credited for inspiring the British to victory.

Third Test

The Australian's wrapped up the Super League Test series with a 37–20 win over the Lions at Elland Road in Leeds. The Australians also extended their unbeaten run against Great Britain at Elland Road in Leeds, having won all four of their games with the Lions played at the stadium since 1986.

References

External links
Great Britain vs Australia SL 1997 at rugbyleagueproject.org

Super League
1997 in Australian rugby league
1997 in English rugby league